Moon Seong-hyeok (Korean: 문성혁; Hanja: 文成赫; also known as Daniel Seong-hyeok Moon; born 1958) is a South Korean professor at World Maritime University served as the Minister of Oceans and Fisheries under President Moon Jae-in from 2019 to 2022.  

Before appointed as minister, Moon served at WMU for over 11 years from 2008 as the INMARSAT Professorial Chair, Associate Academic Dean, and Head of Port Management specialization. He previously worked at Korea Maritime and Ocean University from 1984 to 2013 as its professor, project manager and senior leadership member. Before joining academia, he worked as a first officer at now HMM. 

He holds three degrees - a bachelor in navigation science and master's in port transport from Korea Maritime and Ocean University and a doctorate in port economics from Cardiff University.

References 

Living people
1958 births
Alumni of Cardiff University
Government ministers of South Korea
Academic staff of Korea Maritime and Ocean University
Fisheries ministers
Academic staff of World Maritime University